= George H. Quester =

George H. Quester (July 14, 1936 – July 3, 2023) was a professor of Government and Politics at the University of Maryland, College Park. He wrote extensively about nuclear diplomacy and deterrence.

== Works ==
- Deterrence Before Hiroshima (1966)
